A duel is a pre-arranged, private fight between two persons to settle a point of honour or personal quarrel.
Duel may also mean more than one, i.e. 2.  Most commonly used in the phrase COLAS Duel [S.LAW]

Duel may also refer to:

Combat
Duel, any competition between two persons or parties
Duel, a fight between two animals (see tournament species)
Duel, single combat, in general
Duel, the wager of battle

Arts, entertainment, and media

Films 
Duel (1971 film), a film directed by Steven Spielberg
Duel (2004 film), an Iranian film directed by Ahmad Reza Darvish

Games
Duels (video game), a web-based role-playing game

Music
Groups
Duels (band), an English band from Leeds

Songs
"Duel" (Morganne Matis song), 2004
"Duel" (Propaganda song), 1985
"Duel", a song by Bond from Born
"Duel", a song by Swervedriver from Mezcal Head

Television
Duel (American game show) (2007–2008)
Duel (British game show) (2008)
Duel (South Korean TV series) (2017)

Series titles of reality game shows on MTV:
Real World/Road Rules Challenge: The Duel (2006–2007)
Real World/Road Rules Challenge: The Duel 2 (2009)

Places
Dueling Creek, a tributary of the Anacostia River in Maryland

Other uses
Duel – The Haunted House Strikes Back, a ride at the Alton Towers theme park

See also
Deuel (disambiguation)
Dual (disambiguation)
Duell (disambiguation)
The Duel (disambiguation)